Montagnula is a genus of fungi in the family Montagnulaceae. The genus, circumscribed by mycologist Augusto Napoleone Berlese in 1896, contains an estimated 24 species, but is probably polyphyletic as currently circumscribed.

The genus name of Montagnula is in honour of Jean Pierre François Camille Montagne (1784–1866), who was a French military physician and botanist who specialized in the fields of bryology and mycology.

References

Pleosporales